Metamya intersecta is a moth of the subfamily Arctiinae. It was described by George Hampson in 1898. It is found in Pará, Brazil.

References

 

Arctiinae
Moths described in 1898